In mechanical engineering, many terms are associated into pairs called duals. A dual of a relationship is formed by interchanging force (stress) and deformation (strain) in an expression.  

Here is a partial list of mechanical dualities:

 force — deformation
 stress  — strain 
 stiffness method — flexibility method

Examples

Constitutive relation 

 stress and strain (Hooke's law.)

See also
 Duality (electrical circuits)
 Hydraulic analogy
 List of dualities
 Series and parallel springs

References

 Fung, Y. C., A First Course in CONTINUUM MECHANICS, 2nd edition, Prentice-Hall, Inc. 1977

Mechanical engineering
Mechanical engineering